The American daily newspaper The New York Times publishes multiple weekly list ranking the best selling books in the United States. The lists are split in three genres—fiction, nonfiction and children's books. Both the fiction and nonfiction lists are further split into multiple lists.

Changes to the list
In November 2010, The New York Times announced it would be tracking e-book best-seller lists in fiction and nonfiction starting in early 2011. "RoyaltyShare, a San Diego-based company that tracks data and aggregates sales information for publishers, will ... provide [e-book] data". The two new e-book lists were first published with the February 13, 2011, issue, the first tracks combined print and e-book sales, the second tracks e-book sales only (both lists are further sub-divided into Fiction and Nonfiction). In addition a third new list was published on the web only, which tracks combined print sales (hardcover and paperback) in fiction and nonfiction.

Fiction

Hardcover fiction
The following list ranks the best selling fiction books, in the hardcover fiction category.

Combined print and e-book fiction
The following list ranks the best selling fiction books, in the combined print and e-book fiction category.

The most popular books of the year was The Help by Kathryn Stockett, and Water for Elephants by Sara Gruen with respectively 15 and 8 cumulative weeks at the top. The Help had been released in 2009, was a #1 best seller in 2010, and had a resurgence in 2011. The prolific  James Patterson was at the top for three different books (Tick Tock, Now You See Her and Kill Alex Cross).

Nonfiction

Hardcover nonfiction
The following list ranks the best selling nonfiction books, in the hardcover nonfiction category.
The most frequent weekly best seller of the year was Unbroken by Laura Hillenbrand with 13 weeks at the top of the list.

See also
 Publishers Weekly list of bestselling novels in the United States in the 2010s

References

2011
.
New York Times best sellers
New York Times best sellers
New York Times best sellers